Everson is a borough in Fayette County, Pennsylvania, United States. The population was 768 at the 2020 census. It was incorporated in 1903.

Geography
Everson is located on the northern edge of Fayette County at  (40.090582, -79.587043). It is on the south side of Jacobs Creek, a tributary of the Youghiogheny River and which forms the border with Westmoreland County. The borough of Scottdale is to the north, directly across the creek from Everson.

Demographics

As of the census of 2000, there were 842 people, 351 households, and 233 families residing in the borough. The population density was 3,869.6 people per square mile (1,477.7/km2). There were 385 housing units at an average density of 1,769.4 per square mile (675.7/km2). The racial makeup of the borough was 96.08% White, 3.44% African American, 0.12% Asian, and 0.36% from two or more races.

There were 351 households, out of which 29.6% had children under the age of 18 living with them, 49.0% were married couples living together, 10.0% had a female householder with no husband present, and 33.6% were non-families. 29.3% of all households were made up of individuals, and 16.2% had someone living alone who was 65 years of age or older. The average household size was 2.40 and the average family size was 2.94.

In the borough, the population was spread out, with 22.4% under the age of 18, 7.8% from 18 to 24, 29.6% from 25 to 44, 19.1% from 45 to 64, and 21.0% who were 65 years of age or older. The median age was 39 years. For every 100 females, there were 98.6 males. For every 100 females age 18 and over, there were 91.5 males.

The median income for a household in the borough was $25,500, and the median income for a family was $30,769. Males had a median income of $25,972 versus $17,188 for females. The per capita income for the borough was $12,928. About 13.9% of families and 15.9% of the population were below the poverty line, including 27.8% of those under age 18 and 12.5% of those age 65 or over.

Education
Everson is served by the Southmoreland School District.

Notable person
B. Smith (Barbara Smith), television personality and restaurant operator

References

Populated places established in 1903
Pittsburgh metropolitan area
Boroughs in Fayette County, Pennsylvania
1903 establishments in Pennsylvania